Dimitrios Dalakouras (born 31 March 1999) is a Greek professional footballer who plays as a midfielder for Panionios.

Career

Panetolikos
Dalakouras began his career with the youth club of Panetolikos.

He made his Superleague debut on 3 February 2018 in a match against Panathinaikos.

References

External links
SuperLeague Profile

1999 births
Living people
Greek footballers
Greece youth international footballers
Super League Greece players
Panetolikos F.C. players
A.E. Karaiskakis F.C. players
Association football midfielders
Footballers from Agrinio